Birdland is a jazz club started in New York City on December 15, 1949. The original Birdland, which was located at 1678 Broadway, just north of West 52nd Street in Manhattan, was closed in 1965 due to increased rents, but it re-opened for one night in 1979. A revival began in 1986 with the opening of the second nightclub by the same name that is now located in Manhattan's Theater District, not far from the original nightclub's location. The current location is in the same building as the previous headquarters of The New York Observer.

The original Birdland (1949–1965)

1678 Broadway, below the street level

Irving Levy (1923–1959), Morris Levy, and Oscar Goodstein – along with six other partners – purchased the venue in 1949 from Joseph "Joe the Wop" Catalano. They adopted the name "Birdland" to capitalize on the profile of Charlie "Yardbird" Parker.

The club was originally scheduled to open on September 8, 1949, but this was put back to December 15 following difficulties in getting a liquor license. The opening night was "A Journey Through Jazz", consisting of various styles of the music up to that point, played by "Maxie Kaminsky, Hot Lips Page, Lester Young, Charlie Parker, Harry Belafonte, Stan Getz, and Lennie Tristano, in that order."

Parker played very few jobs at Birdland. This was not because his drug addiction caused problems for the management, but (according to Gene Ramey) Goodstein said, "He was continually wanting money."  Ramey had persuaded Goodstein to let Parker perform at Birdland with his band on a pair of Monday nights in 1954.

The neon sign at the front of the club read, "Birdland, Jazz Corner of the World". The venue seated 500 people and had bandstand space for a big band—the Count Basie Orchestra was a regular booking. The venue had a long bar, tables, booths, and a fenced-in bullpen, several rows of folding chairs, some directly alongside a corner of the bandstand, accessible with just the $1.50 admission fee to the venue; a drink could be carried there by an adult, but teenagers were admitted there, too. Irving Levy and Morris Levy were the main owners but the club was operated by Oscar Goodstein, who took tickets and tended the bar. In the late 50s, he moved his post to the back hallway where he could compare the trays from the kitchen with the order tickets. Some lucky few could spend the wee hours chatting with him and reading letters musicians like Charlie Mingus sent to him. Goldstein called Mingus a prolific writer.  The name was carried through into the feature of caged finches inside the club.

The venue attracted other jazz musicians who also made recordings there. This includes Art Blakey's February 1954 gigs resulting in the A Night at Birdland albums, most of John Coltrane's Live at Birdland, the Toshiko – Mariano Quartet's Live at Birdland, and Count Basie's Basie at Birdland. Dizzy Gillespie, Thelonious Monk, Miles Davis, Louie Bellson, Bud Powell, Johnny Smith, Stan Getz, Lester Young, and many others made appearances. George Shearing's standard "Lullaby of Birdland" (1952) was named in the club's honor.

The club's original master of ceremonies, the diminutive, four feet tall Pee Wee Marquette, was known for mispronouncing the names of musicians, if they refused to tip him. The disc jockey Symphony Sid broadcast live on WJZ early in the club's existence. Later broadcasts organized in the 1950s with the musicians’ union were relayed across network radio with announcers and guests like the jazz critic Leonard Feather.

On August 25, 1959, Miles Davis was beaten by a New York City policeman on the sidewalk in front of Birdland, during a performing engagement at the club.

During the 1950s, Birdland also became a fashionable place for celebrities to be seen, with Frank Sinatra and Ava Gardner, Gary Cooper, Marlon Brando, Marilyn Monroe, Sugar Ray Robinson, Marlene Dietrich, Joe Louis, Judy Garland and others as regulars. Irving Levy was stabbed to death at the club on Sunday, January 26, 1959 (after midnight January 25) while the group of trombonist Urbie Green was performing. The body was discovered in the rear of the club, near the service area. The stabbing had apparently occurred unnoticed by the patrons. Irving's younger brother, Morris, took over Irving's role in the club, and from 1959 through the early 1960s, the club enjoyed great success as one of the few remaining jazz clubs in the area. Johnnie Garry, the production coordinator and historian for the Jazzmobile project, managed the club in the early 1960s.

Chapter 11 bankruptcy (June 1964)

In June 1964, Birdland filed for Chapter 11 bankruptcy in New York Federal Court.  Goodstein was president of the club at the time.  Creditors included Goodstein himself ($22,490), NLP Restaurant ($12,275), and saxophonist Gerry Mulligan ($3,500), who had been booked through International Talent Associates. In an effort to stem losses in 1964, Birdland began to feature jazz artists that played a more traditional style of jazz, rather than the "way-out" artists. In 1965, Goodstein closed Birdland. The premises was taken over by Lloyd Price, an R&B and rock-and-roll singer who re-dedicated the venue and named it the Turntable.

Birdland (1985–present)

2745 Broadway at 105th (1986–1996)
A new Birdland Club, initially owned by John R. Valenti, opened in the Upper West Side of Manhattan in 1985, at 2745 Broadway at 105th Street, and presented emerging artists to a neighborhood audience .

315 West 44th Street, between 8th and 9th Avenues (1996–present)
In 1996, Valenti moved the club to West 44th Street, west of Eighth Avenue in Midtown Manhattan where it features a full weekly schedule of performers. These have included Michael Brecker, Pat Metheny, Lee Konitz, Diana Krall, Dave Holland, Regina Carter, and Tito Puente. It is the club where Toshiko Akiyoshi's jazz orchestra played its final concert on December 29, 2003. As mentioned above, she had also played at the original Birdland. The Birdland Big Band was created in 2006.

Pop culture references 

Birdland was frequented by many of the writers of the Beat generation. Reference to Birdland is made in Jack Kerouac's novel On the Road: "I saw him wish a well-to-do man Merry Christmas so volubly a five-spot in change for twenty was never missed. We went out and spent it in Birdland, the bop joint. Lester Young was on the stand, eternity on his huge eyelids." Birdland is also referenced in Emmett Grogan's novel Ringolevio. "From the get-go, Birdland became one of his favourite haunts."

George Shearing's jazz standard "Lullaby of Birdland" (with lyrics later added by George David Weiss) refers to the club. Sarah Vaughan's 1954 version was a hit.

In 1993, Us3 released the single "Cantaloop", which opens with the line: "Ladies and gentlemen, as you know, we have something special down here at Birdland this evening"; Pee Wee Marquette's opening announcement from Art Blakey's first Birdland album in 1954. Their second album "Broadway & 52nd" (1997) was named in reference to the location of Birdland.

Weather Report released their most commercially successful hit entitled "Birdland" on the album Heavy Weather in 1977. The Manhattan Transfer recorded a cover version of the same song in 1979, with vocalese lyrics describing the club at its peak.

U2 references the club in the song "Angel of Harlem" with the lyrics "Birdland on 53, the streets sounds like a symphony..." The club was however, on Broadway near 52nd street, not 53rd.

In the play Send Me No Flowers, George Kimball relates a story concerning a female friend who ran off with a "bongo player from Birdland" after her husband died. The bongo player subsequently "took her for every cent". In the play Middle of the Night, the husband remembers the good old days at Birdland with his wife, in an attempt to save their marriage.

Sesame Street featured a night club called Birdland, run by Hoots the Owl, which was occupied by multiple birds.

William Claxton took a picture of the club's entrance in 1960.

The club, along with several artists such as Miles Davis, Ella Fitzgerald, and James Moody, are mentioned in Quincy Jones song "Jazz Corner of the World" [Introduction to Birdland].

Ray Charles references a dance of the same name in the lyrics of his song "What'd I Say": "See the girl with the red dress on, She can do the Birdland all night long...."

Birdland discography

The original Birdland (1949–1965)
 1949: Live at Birdland 1949 (Jazz Records 1) – Lennie Tristano Quintet featuring Warne Marsh, Billy Bauer, Arnold Fishkin, and Jeff Morton.
 1950: One Night In Birdland - Charlie Parker
1952: Disorder at the Border - Coleman Hawkins
1954: A Night at Birdland – Art Blakey
1955: W!ld B!ll Davis at Birdland - Wild Bill Davis
 1956: Birdland Stars on Tour 1956 (Bluebird) – Kenny Dorham, Conte Candoli, trumpets; Al Cohn, tenor sax; Phil Woods, alto sax; Hank Jones, piano; John Simmons, bass; Kenny Clarke, drums
 1958: Monday Nights at Birdland - 2 CD set   Lee Morgan, Hank Mobley, Billy Root, Curtis Fuller
 1959: At the Jazz Corner of the World — Art Blakey and the Jazz Messengers
 1960: Meet You at the Jazz Corner of the World — Art Blakey
 1960/1961: Live at Birdland – Toshiko – Mariano Quartet
 1961: Basie at Birdland – Count Basie and his orchestra
 1962: Joe Williams Live! A Swingin' Night at Birdland – Joe Williams and a quintet featuring Jimmy Forrest and Harry "Sweets" Edison
 1963: Ugetsu — Art Blakey's Jazz Messengers
 1964: Live at Birdland – John Coltrane Quartet, featuring Coltrane (tenor sax); McCoy Tyner (piano); Jimmy Garrison (bass); Elvin Jones (drums)

Later
 March 1990: West 42'nd Street Gary Bartz Quintet Claudio Roditi
 April 1990:  Swing Summit Harry Edison Buddy Tate Frank Wess
 June 1990: Ebony Rhapsody Ricky Ford, Jaki Byard, Milt Hinton, Ben Riley
 November 1990: There Goes the Neighborhood Gary Bartz Quartet
 September 1991: American-African Blues Ricky Ford, Jaki Byard, Milt Hinton, Ben Riley
 December 1996: Jimmy Bruno Trio with Guest Bobby Watson

Notable performers

Original Birdland (1949–1965)

 Chet Baker
 Count Basie
 Louie Bellson
 Tony Bennett
 George Benson
 Art Blakey
 Dave Brubeck
 Ron Carter
 John Coltrane
 Wild Bill Davis
 Miles Davis
 Sammy Davis Jr.
 Blossom Dearie
 Billy Eckstine
 Duke Ellington
 Bill Evans
 Maynard Ferguson
 Ella Fitzgerald
 Slim Gaillard
 Erroll Garner
 Stan Getz
 Dizzy Gillespie
 Friedrich Gulda
 Lionel Hampton
 Slide Hampton
 Roy Haynes
 Jon Hendricks
 Billie Holiday
 Dave Holland
 Freddie Hubbard
 Hank Jones
 Quincy Jones
 La Lupe
 Lambert, Hendricks & Ross
 Michel Legrand
 Ramsey Lewis
 Pat Martino
 Marian McPartland
 Robin Meade
 Pat Moran McCoy
 Carmen McRae
 Charles Mingus
 Modern Jazz Quartet
 Thelonious Monk
 Gerry Mulligan
 Anita O'Day
 Chico O'Farrill
 Charlie Parker
 Oscar Peterson
 Oscar Pettiford
 Lloyd Price
 Machito
 Tito Puente
 Tito Rodríguez
 Bud Powell
 Buddy Rich
 Mongo Santamaria
 George Shearing
 Bobby Short
 Horace Silver
 Nina Simone
 Johnny Smith
 Billy Taylor
 Clark Terry
 Mel Torme
 Lennie Tristano
 McCoy Tyner
 Sarah Vaughan
 Dinah Washington
 Joe Williams
 Tony Williams
 Lester Young
 Joe Zawinul

Birdland (1985–present)

 Toshiko Akiyoshi
 James Stacy Barbour
 Michael Brecker
 Ann Hampton Callaway
 Ron Carter
 Ravi Coltrane
 Harry Connick Jr.
 Kurt Elling
 Kevin Eubanks
 Michael Feinstein
 Champian Fulton
 Anita Gillette
 Savion Glover
 Ilene Graff
 Ariana Grande
 Jeff Harnar
 Sam Harris
 Norah Jones
 Stanley Jordan
 Diana Krall
 Bonnie Langford
 Joe Lovano
 Lorna Luft
 Melissa Manchester
 Marilyn Maye
 Marian McPartland
 Pat Metheny
 Liza Minnelli
 James Moody
 Mark Murphy
 Oscar Peterson
 Michel Petrucciani
 John Pizzarelli
 Charlie Puth
 Chita Rivera
 McCoy Tyner
 John Scofield
 Maria Schneider
 Miranda Sings
 Phoebe Snow
 Billy Stritch
 Frank Vignola
 Phil Woods
 Yellowjackets

See also 

 List of jazz clubs

References

External links 

 

Music venues in Manhattan
Jazz clubs in New York City
Charlie Parker
1949 establishments in New York City
Music venues completed in 1949
Broadway (Manhattan)